Krzysztof Piotr Zaremba (born 12 December 1972 in Szczecin) is a Polish politician. He was elected to Sejm on 25 September 2005, getting 22,812 votes in 41 Szczecin district as a candidate from the Civic Platform list.

He was also a member of Sejm 2001-2005.

See also
Members of Polish Sejm 2005-2007

External links

Krzysztof Zaremba - parliamentary page - includes declarations of interest, voting record, and transcripts of speeches.

1972 births
Civic Platform politicians
Living people
Members of the Polish Sejm 2005–2007
Members of the Polish Sejm 2001–2005
Politicians from Szczecin